Jalan Kesang Tasik (Malacca state route M112 and Johor state route J112) is a major road in Malacca and Johor state, Malaysia.

List of junctions

Roads in Malacca
Roads in Johor